Turochaksky District (Turaçak aymak) is an administrative and municipal district (raion), one of the ten in the Altai Republic, Russia. It is located in the north of the republic. Its administrative center is the rural locality (a selo) of Turochak. As of the 2010 Census, the total population of the district was 12,484, with the population of Turochak accounting for 44.7% of that number.

Administrative and municipal status
Within the framework of administrative divisions, Turochaksky District is one of the ten in the Altai Republic. As a municipal division, the district is incorporated as Turochaksky Municipal District. Both administrative and municipal districts are divided into the same nine rural settlements, comprising thirty-two rural localities. The selo of Turochak serves as the administrative center of both the administrative and municipal district.

References

Notes

Sources

Districts of the Altai Republic
 
